Washington and Western Railroad may refer to several railroads in the U.S. state of Virginia:
Washington and Western Railroad (1882–1883), predecessor of the Southern Railway, later leased to the Washington and Old Dominion Railroad
Washington and Western Railroad (1889–1890), predecessor of the Norfolk and Western Railway